Stanton is a civil parish in the Derbyshire Dales district of Derbyshire, England. The parish contains 44 listed buildings that are recorded in the National Heritage List for England.  Of these, three are listed at Grade II*, the middle of the three grades, and the others are at Grade II, the lowest grade.  The parish contains the village of Stanton in Peak and the surrounding countryside.  In the parish are two country houses that are listed, together with associated structures.  Most of the other listed buildings are smaller houses, cottages and associated structures, farmhouses and farm buildings.  The rest of the listed buildings include a public house, churches, a milestone and a commemorative tower.


Key

Buildings

References

Citations

Sources

 

Lists of listed buildings in Derbyshire